John Lumsden of Auchinleck (1692–1770) was an 18th century minister who was Professor of Divinity at King's College, Aberdeen and served as Moderator of the General Assembly in 1746.

Life
He was born around 1692/3 the second son of Alexander Lumsden schoolmaster at Chapel of Garioch living at Auchinleck near New Deer.

In July 1721 he was ordained as minister of Keithhall in  place of Francis Dauney. In 1727 he was translated to Banchory. In 1735 he moved to be Professor of Divinity at King's College, Aberdeen holding this position for over 40 years.

In 1746 he succeeded the William Wishart as Moderator of the General Assembly of the Church of Scotland the highest position in the Scottish Church. He was succeeded in turn by Robert Kinloch.

He was a friend or acquaintance of Alexander Boswell, Lord Auchinleck, father of James Boswell.

He died at Chapel of Garioch on 2 July 1770. He is buried in the churchyard of St Machar's Cathedral.

Family

Around 1718 he was married to Joanna Leslie (d.1761). Their children included:

Agnes Lumsden (1719-1807)
Jane Lumsden (1725-1758)
Theresa Lumsden (1730-1819)
Charles Lumsden (b.1734) died in infancy
Alexander Lumsden MD (d.1778)

Students

In his career at King's College he taught many people critical to Scotland's church history:

Alexander Gerard (graduated 1744)
Duncan Shaw (graduated 1747)
James Sherriffs (graduated 1770)

References
 

1692 births
1770 deaths
People from Aberdeenshire
Moderators of the General Assembly of the Church of Scotland
Academics of the University of Aberdeen